Jørgen Rostrup (born 5 November 1978) is a Norwegian orienteering competitor, two times winner of the World Orienteering Championships, Short distance in 1999, and Classic distance in 2001. He also obtained bronze on the Short distance in 2001. He is two times Relay World Champion, as member of the Norwegian winning teams in 2004 in Sweden, and 2005 in Japan.

He won gold medal twice in the Junior World Championships, in 1997 and 1998.

References

External links

1978 births
Living people
Norwegian orienteers
Male orienteers
Foot orienteers
World Orienteering Championships medalists
20th-century Norwegian people
Junior World Orienteering Championships medalists